Haldane 'Hal' Naude Luscombe is a former Wales international rugby union player. His usual position was on the wing or in the centres.

The last team he played for was Worcester Warriors in the top level of English rugby, the Guinness Premiership. He previously played for the Newport Gwent Dragons in Wales and Harlequins of England.

Luscombe attended Diocesan College, Cape Town. He has also played for the Wales under-21 team.

It was announced in March 2008 that Luscombe would be joining Worcester Warriors for the 2008/09 season on a two-year contract. He would be joining up with his former national and Newport Gwent Dragons coach, Mike Ruddock. Unfortunately Luscombe only played 6 times during that campaign having had a series of injury problems. On 24 July 2009 it was announced that he had retired from professional rugby with immediate effect. The 28-year-old was released from his Sixways contract by mutual consent.

 "Hal is a terrific guy who has been a fantastic player for years. I would like to thank him for his service and pay tribute to his outstanding character and performances over the years, most notably as a member of the Wales Grand Slam winning team of 2005." - Mike Ruddock

References

External links
 Worcester Warriors profile
 Wales profile
 Newport Gwent Dragons profile
 Guinness Premiership Profile

1981 births
Living people
Rugby union centres
Rugby union wings
Wales international rugby union players
South African rugby union players
Welsh rugby union players
People from the Central Karoo District Municipality
Alumni of Diocesan College, Cape Town
Harlequin F.C. players
Dragons RFC players
Worcester Warriors players
Rugby union players from the Western Cape